Necklace fern is a common name for several plants and may refer to:

Asplenium flabellifolium, native to Australia and New Zealand
Lindsaea